Wang Xizhe, born in 1949 in Sichuan, is a Chinese writer and a political critic.

Biography 
Together with Liu Xiaobo he wrote and signed a letter that was published on September 30, 1996 
This letter called on the Chinese authorities to reconcile the Chinese Communist Party and Guomindang  and have dialogue with the Dalai Lama, the exiled head of the Tibetan government.

Liu Xiaobo was later arrested and sentenced to 3 years of "re-education through labor" camp. To escape from arrest, Wang Xizhe took refuge in Hong Kong. His escape was revealed on October 13.  Two days later on October 15, he arrived in the United States where he obtained political asylum.

References

Chinese refugees
Chinese dissidents
Society of China
Human rights
Tibetan independence movement
People of the Cultural Revolution
People's Republic of China emigrants to the United States
1948 births
Living people